This is a list of notable bakeries. A bakery is an establishment that produces and sells flour-based food baked in an oven such as bread, cakes, pastries, and pies. Some retail bakeries are also cafés, serving coffee and tea to customers who wish to consume the baked goods on the premises.

Worldwide
 Le Pain Quotidien – global chain of bakery-cafés operating in many countries around the world.  It sells organic bread and cakes in a homey, rustic style.
 Muffin Break – independent company which operates small coffee shops throughout the UK, Australia and New Zealand and India.

By country

Australia

 Adyar Ananda Bhavan
 Bakers Delight
 Balfours
 Breadtop
 Brumby's Bakeries 
 Goodman Fielder
 Michel's Patisserie
 Mrs Mac's Pies
 Patties Foods (previously Patties Bakery) – Patties pie is the original flagship product of Patties Bakery.
 Pie Face
 Quality Bakers
 Tip Top Bakeries

Bangladesh
 Cooper's

Canada

 ACE Bakery
 Big Apple
 Canada Bread
 Country Style
 Fairmount Bagel
 George Weston Limited
 Michel's Bakery Café
 Multi-Marques
 Première Moisson
 St-Viateur Bagel
 Vachon Inc.

Chile
 Castaño

China

Hong Kong

 Arome Bakery 
 Kee Wah Bakery 
 La Rose Noire 
 Maxim's Catering 
 Saint Honore Cake Shop

France
 Eric Kayser
 Biscuits Fossier
 Délifrance
 Groupe Holder
 Paul

India

Ghantewala
 Karachi Bakery 
 Mangharam Biscuit 
 Monginis
 Nahoum & Sons
 Parle Products
 Yazdani Bakery

Indonesia
 Eric Kayser
 Holland Bakery

Ireland
 Pat the Baker

Israel

 Angel Bakeries
 Berman's Bakery

Italy
 Pasticceria Boccione

Japan
 Kimuraya Sohonten (:ja:木村屋總本店)
Takaki Bakery
 Yamazaki Baking

Malaysia
 The Italian Baker
 Rotiboy
 Secret Recipe

Mexico
 Grupo Bimbo

Nepal
 Krishna Pauroti

New Zealand
 Jimmy's Pies

Norway
 Åpent Bakeri

Philippines
 Goldilocks Bakeshop
 Red Ribbon

Singapore

 Bengawan Solo
 BreadTalk

South Korea
 Tous Les Jours

Taiwan

 85C Bakery Cafe

Ukraine
 Yarych Confectionery

United Kingdom

 AB Mauri
 Bakers Oven
 Beigel Bake
 Brace's Bakery
 Bread Ahead
 British Bakeries
 Burton's Biscuit Company
 Chelsea Bun House
 Connoisseur's Bakery
 Cooks the Bakery
 Cooplands
 Druckers Vienna Patisserie
 Fox's Biscuits
 Galloways Bakers
 Ginsters
 Greggs
 Grodzinski Bakery
 Hovis
 HR Bradfords
 Huntley & Palmers
 Holland's Pies
 Irwin's Bakery
 Jus-Rol
 Krispy Kreme UK
 Lisboa Patisserie
 Millie's Cookies
 Mr Kipling
 New York Bagel
 Peek Freans
 Peters
 Pork Farms
 Poundbakery
 Premier Foods
 Rank Hovis McDougall
 Rathbones Bakeries
 Ryvita Company
 Sayers
 Tunnock's
 United Biscuits
 Walkers Shortbread
 Warburtons
 Warrens Bakery
 William Jackson Food Group
 Wrights Pies

United States

 Acme Bread Company
 Alessi Bakery
 An Xuyên Bakery, Portland, Oregon
 Askatu Bakery, Seattle
 Archway Cookies
 Arizmendi Bakery
 Arnold Bakery
 Atlanta Bread Company
 Au Bon Pain
 Auntie Anne's
 Baked & Wired
 Baked & Wired
 Baked by Melissa
 Bakery Nouveau
 Bella's Italian Bakery, Portland, Oregon
 Berlu, Portland, Oregon
 Big Apple Bagels
 Bimbo Bakeries USA
 Blue Chip Cookies
 Boudin Bakery
 Breadsmith
 Brownberry
 Bruegger's
 Burry's
 Café du Monde
 Cake Girls
 Cake in a Cup
 Carlo's Bake Shop
 Cavanagh Company
 Cinnabon
 Clinton Street Baking Company & Restaurant
 Cloverhill Bakery
 Coco's Bakery
 Collin Street Bakery
 Colombo Baking Company
 The Confectional, Seattle
 Cookies by Design
 Corner Bakery Cafe
 Country Club Bakery
 Crumbs Bake Shop
 The Crumpet Shop
 Czech Stop and Little Czech Bakery
 Dahlia Bakery, Seattle
 Dancing Deer Baking Co.
 Dave's Killer Bread
 Dewey's Bakery
 Dong Phuong Oriental Bakery
 Dorsch's White Cross Bakery
 Dozen Bake Shop
 Elsasser Bakery
 Enrico Biscotti Company
 Entenmann's
 Erick Schat's Bakkerÿ
 F. A. Kennedy Steam Bakery
 Farina Bakery, Portland, Oregon
 Federal Pretzel Baking Company
 Flowers Foods
 Franklin Cider Mill
 French Meadow Bakery
 Fuchs Bakery
 Fuji Bakery
 G. H. Bent Company
 General Host
 Georgetown Bagelry
 Georgetown Cupcake
 Golden Gate Fortune Cookie Company
 Grand Central Bakery
 Great American Cookies
 Great Harvest Bread Company
 Greyston Bakery
 Gus's Pretzels
 Heiner's Bakery
 Hello Robin, Seattle
 Helms Bakery
 Henry S. Levy and Sons
 Honey Dew Donuts
 Hostess Brands
 Il Fornaio
 Insomnia Cookies
 JaCiva's Bakery and Chocolatier, Portland, Oregon
 Jenny Lee Bakery
 JinJu Patisserie, Portland, Oregon
 Joan's on Third
 Kanemitsu Bakery
 King's Hawaiian
 Kiss My Bundt Bakery
 Kossar's Bialys
 Krispy Kreme
 La Bou
 La Brea Bakery
 La Parisienne French Bakery, Seattle
 La Segunda Bakery
 Lady M
 Lauretta Jean's
 Le Macaron
 Le Panier, Seattle
 Leidenheimer Baking Company
 LeJeune's Bakery
 Lender's Bagels
 Leonard's Bakery
 Levain Bakery
 Liguria Bakery
 Little T American Baker, Portland, Oregon
 The London Plane, Seattle
 Lovejoy Bakers, Portland, Oregon
 Lundberg Bakery
 Lyndell's Bakery
 Magnolia Bakery
 Martin's Famous Pastry Shoppe, Inc.
 Milwaukie Pastry Kitchen
 Mother's Cookies
 New Cascadia Traditional, Portland, Oregon
 Nuvrei, Portland, Oregon
 Old London Foods
 One World Cafe
 Orwasher's bakery
 Oyatsupan Bakers, Oregon
 Panera Bread
 Paradise Bakery & Café
 Pepperidge Farm
 Pike Place Bakery
 Piroshky Piroshky
 Pix Pâtisserie
 Publix
 Racine Danish Kringles
 Renz Block
 Rhino Foods
 Roeser's Bakery
 Roman Candle
 Roselyn Bakery
 Schlotzsky's
 Schmidt Baking Company
 Seastar Bakery, Portland, Oregon
 Sebastiano's, Portland, Oregon
 Semifreddi's Bakery
 Shipley Do-Nuts
 Sprinkles Cupcakes
 Spudnut Shops
 Stroehmann
 Sturgis Pretzel House
 Swoboda Bakery
 Table Talk Pies
 Tanaka
 Tartine
 Tastykake
 Three Girls Bakery, Seattle
 Twisted Croissant, Portland, Oregon
 Udi’s Healthy Foods
 United States Bakery
 Van de Kamp's Holland Dutch Bakeries
 Vegan Treats Bakery
 Veniero's
 Yonah Shimmel's Knish Bakery
 Your Black Muslim Bakery
 Zuckercreme, Portland, Oregon

Vietnam
 Kinh Do Corporation

By type

Bakery cafes

Doughnut shop bakeries

Kosher bakeries
 Angel Bakeries
 Berman's Bakery
 Grodzinski Bakery
 Yonah Shimmel's Knish Bakery

See also

 Baker
 List of baked goods
 List of bakery cafés
 List of doughnut shops
 List of food companies
 Pâtisserie

References

Further reading

External links

 American Bakers Association – Member list

Bakeries
bakeriesoo
Bakeries